New York City's 37th City Council district is one of 51 districts in the New York City Council. It is currently represented by Democrat Sandy Nurse, who took office in 2022.

Geography
District 37 covers a series of majority-Hispanic neighborhoods along Brooklyn's northern border, including a large swath of Bushwick as well as Ocean Hill, Cypress Hills, City Line, and small parts of East New York and Brownsville.

The district overlaps with Brooklyn Community Boards 4, 5, and 16, and with New York's 7th and 8th congressional districts. It also overlaps with the 18th, 19th, and 25th districts of the New York State Senate, and with the 53rd, 54th, 55th, and 60th districts of the New York State Assembly.

Recent election results

2021
In 2019, voters in New York City approved Ballot Question 1, which implemented ranked-choice voting in all local elections. Under the new system, voters have the option to rank up to five candidates for every local office. Voters whose first-choice candidates fare poorly will have their votes redistributed to other candidates in their ranking until one candidate surpasses the 50 percent threshold. If one candidate surpasses 50 percent in first-choice votes, then ranked-choice tabulations will not occur.

2020 special
In January 2020, Councilman Rafael Espinal resigned in order to take a job with the Freelancers Union, leaving his seat vacant. An April special election was called, but due to the onset of the COVID-19 pandemic, it was moved to align with the concurrent 2020 elections. While the election initially appeared to be a competitive contest between Darma Diaz, Sandy Nurse, and several other candidates, a complex series of judicial rulings and political maneuvers meant that all candidates but Diaz were removed from the ballot, and Diaz won both the primary and general elections uncontested.

2017

2013

References

New York City Council districts